A lienzo charro is an arena where charros hold the events of charreada, coleadero and jaripeo. American rodeo events may also take place at a lienzo charro.

A lienzo has two areas: one  and a second, circular area  in diameter. Charreada is a team competition in which teams go head-to-head to win points in different competitions. The team with the most points at the end wins. The coleadero, also known as the torneo de colas, is a multi- or single-competitor event in which a mounted charro throws a bull to the ground by catching its tail, wrapping it under his leg, and making a turn. The lienzo charro may be enclosed to accommodate jaripeo competitions, as well as American rodeo events.

References

External links 
Arte en la Charerria: The Artisanship of Mexican Equestrian Culture at the National Cowboy & Western Heritage Museum, Oklahoma City
Art of the Charrería at the Museum of the American West
Charreria, the symbol of Mexico
Federación Mexicana de Charrería (Spanish)
Nacional de Charros (Spanish)
Official Rulebook (Spanish)
Mexican website for charro news (Spanish)
"CHARRO USA" U.S. Radio, Magazine and Media News off Charreria (Mexican Rodeo)
http://www.deportecharro.com

Charreada
Mexican culture
Spanish language
Sport in Mexico
Sports originating in Mexico
Pastoralists
National symbols of Mexico